J.J. Fad is an American female rap group from Rialto, California. The name was an acronym of the original group members' given names (Juana, Juanita, Fatima, Anna, and Dana), but when the line-up changed the tradition developed that it stood for Just Jammin', Fresh and Def. The group was backed by DJ Train (Clarence Lars).

In June 2022, the city of Rialto held a ceremony to honor JJ Fad by naming a street after the group. Lead by local councilman Joe Baca, Jr, parts of Lurelane off Cactus, was named JJ Fad Way.

History

Beginnings
J.J. Fad began in 1985 as a quintet comprising Juana Burns (MC J.B.), Dana Birks (Baby-D), Anna Cash (Lady Anna), Fatima Shaheed (O.G. Rocker) and Juanita Lee (Crazy J.). It was one of the original acts signed to Ruthless Records by Eazy-E. In 1987, this line-up released its only recording, the single "Anotha Ho" backed with "Supersonic" ("Anotha Ho" was the A-side), produced by Arabian Prince.

Supersonic
Due to management and financial disagreements, Cash, Shaheed and Lee quit the group, leaving J.J. Fad as a duo. The remaining original members (Burns and Birks) were joined by Michelle Franklin (Sassy C.) and DJ Train, and together they re-recorded and re-released "Supersonic" in 1988, this time as the A-side. It sold 400,000 copies independently before Eazy-E and Jerry Heller secured the group a major-label recording contract with Atco Records.

The single was followed by the album Supersonic, produced by Arabian Prince, who made J.J. Fad accessible to pop audiences—unlike many West Coast rappers of the day—by including electro elements in their music. Due to their involvement with Ruthless Records, co-producer credits were added for Dr. Dre and DJ Yella.

Both the single "Supersonic" and the album Supersonic were certified gold. (The group believes the single sold 1 million copies in the U.S.—equivalent to platinum status—but this has not been certified.)

Not Just a Fad
With Eazy and Heller enjoying success with N.W.A, it was three years before J.J. Fad returned with a follow-up album. Not Just a Fad was released in 1991, produced by Arabian Prince, Yella and overseen by Eazy, but failed to make an impact. The group disbanded shortly afterward. DJ Train died in 1994 of smoke inhalation.

Later years
After almost two decades out of the music industry raising families, the classic trio of J.J. Fad reunited. The group performs at old-school and freestyle concerts.

In 2004, MF Doom sampled the beatboxing intro from the 1988 video for "Supersonic" in his song "Hoecakes" from his album Mm.. Food.

In 2006, Fergie used an interpolation of "Supersonic" in her song "Fergalicious".

"Supersonic" appeared in the music video game Dance Central 3 (2012), which J. J. Fad promoted on its Facebook page.

The 2015 biopic film Straight Outta Compton left out the story of J. J. Fad and how some in the media felt the group was responsible for "forging a path for the breakout success of N.W.A".

The second trailer for the 2020 movie Sonic the Hedgehog features the song "Supersonic".

Discography

Studio albums

Singles

As lead artist

Featured singles

Guest appearances

References

External links

J. J. Fad's Facebook page

J. J. Fad at Discogs

African-American musical groups
American women rappers
African-American women rappers
American dance girl groups
Atco Records artists
West Coast hip hop groups
Women hip hop groups
Musical groups established in 1985
Musical groups disestablished in 1992
Musical groups reestablished in 2009
People from Rialto, California
Ruthless Records artists
Hip hop groups from California
1985 establishments in California